David Štěpánek (born 30 May 1997) is a professional Czech football centre back currently playing for FK Jablonec in the Czech First League.

Career
He made his career league debut for Jihlava on 23 May 2015 in a Czech First League 4-0 home win against Slovan Liberec.

On 10 January 2019, Štěpánek joined FK Jablonec on a contract until June 2020.

References

External links 
 
 David Štěpánek official international statistics
 
 Profile at FK Jablonec

Czech footballers
1997 births
Living people
Czech First League players
FC Vysočina Jihlava players
FK Jablonec players
Association football midfielders
Czech Republic youth international footballers